The 1994 South Carolina Gamecocks football team represented the University of South Carolina in the Southeastern Conference (SEC) during the 1994 NCAA Division I-A football season.  The Gamecocks were led by head coach Brad Scott and played their home games in Williams-Brice Stadium in Columbia, South Carolina.

Schedule

Roster
QB Steve Taneyhill, Jr 
OL Michael Muse 
QB Wright Mitchell 
QB Desi Sargent 
QB Brandon Bennett* 
RB Leroy Jeter*
RB Rob DeBoer
RB Terry Wilburn 
RB Albert Haynes
RB Anthony Jacobs(WO)
RB Eddie Miller*
WR Robert Brooks* 
WR David Pitchko
WR Asim Penny 
WR Bralyn Bennett 
WR Bill Zorr
WR Darren Greene 
WR Mike Whitman*
TE Matthew Campbell 
TE Boomer Foster 
TE Roderick Howell 
TE Mathew Campbell 
TE Ernest Dye* 
OL Kenny Farrell* 
OL Jay Killen* 
OL Antoine Rivens* 
OL Rich Sweet* 
OL Vincent Dinkins 
OL Kevin Rosenkrans
OL Cedric Bembery*
DL Bobby Brown*
DL Marty Dye* 
DL Troy Duke 
DL David Turnipseed 
DL Ernest Dixon* 
LB James C Mcdougald*
LB Eric Brown* 
LB Gerald Dixon* 
LB Robert Gibson* 
LB Keith Franklin 
LB Joe Reaves
LB Keith Emmons 
LB Toby Cates* 
DB Jerry Inman* 
DB Bru Pender* 
DB Tony Watkins*
DB Frank Adams 
DB Cedric Surratt
DB Norman Greene
DB Daren Parker P

References

South Carolina
South Carolina Gamecocks football seasons
Cheez-It Bowl champion seasons
South Carolina Gamecocks football